This is a timeline of the Independence of Finland. Timeline starts from February Revolution and ends with membership of the League of Nations. Events take place in Saint Petersburg and Finland.

References;

1917
7 March: February Revolution starts in Saint Petersburg 
15 March: Prince Georgy Lvov forms a Provisional government in Saint Petersburg 
15 March: Czar Nicholas II abdicates 
16 March:  Governor-General of Finland Franz Albert Seyn is removed from his office and arrested
20 March: Provisional government imprisons the Imperial family 
19 March: Mikhail Aleksandrovich Stakhovich became new Governor-General of Finland 
20 March: March manifesto is abolished 
26 March: Oskari Tokoi is appointed as the Chairmen of the Senate
16 April: Vladimir Lenin arrives by train from Switzerland via Germany, to Saint Petersburg 
16 July: Bolshevik coup fails in Saint Petersburg 
18 July: Parliament of Finland accepts the Act of Rule of Law
21 July: Aleksandr Kerensky becomes the new Premier of the Provisional government of Russia 
31 July: Provisional government of Russia dissolves the Parliament of Finland 
17 August: Oskari Tokoi resigns from the Senate
17 August: E.N. Setälä becomes the new Chairman of the Senate 
17 September: Nikolai Vissarionovich Nekrasov become the new Governor-General of Finland 
1-2 October: General elections in Finland; Social Democratic Party loses its majority
7 November: Bolshevik coup takes place in Saint Petersburg 
8 November: Labour movement forms Revolution Councils in Finland 
15 November: Parliament of Finland declares itself as the supreme authority in Finland 
4 December: Svinhufvud senate declares Independence of Finland 
6 December: Parliament accepts the Independence of Finland 
31 December: Soviet government recognizes the Independence of Finland 
31 December: Åland declares itself as part of Sweden

1918
4 January: Soviet parliament ratified the recognition of Finnish independence
4 January: Sweden and France recognizes the Finnish independence 
6 January: Germany recognizes the Finnish independence 
10 January: Norway and Denmark recognize the Finnish independence 
25 January: National Guard is declared as Governments troops 
27 January: Labour movement takes power in Finland 
15 February: Swedish Naval ships arrive at Åland 
16 May: White Army marches to Helsinki 
18 May: P.E.Svinhufvud became a State Regent of Finland
27 May: J.K. Paasivi becomes Deputy Chairman of the Senate
29 May: Blue cross flag became a flag of Finland
9 August: Parliament accepts the Constitution of 1772 which starts the process of electing a monarch. 
9 October: Parliament 	selects the Prince Frederick Charles of Hesse as King of Finland
27 November: Paasikivi Senate resigned
12 December: Mannerheim became the new State Regent of Finland 
14 December: Prince Frederick Charles of Hesse abdicates

1919
3 March:  General elections in Finland: Republican front gets majority
17 April: Kaarlo Castrén becomes the Prime Minister of Finland
6 May: United Kingdom recognizes the Independence of Finland
7 May: United States recognizes the Independence of Finland
21 June: Parliament accepts the Republican form of Government
17 July: State Regent Mannerheim ratifies the Republican form of Government
25 July: K.J. Ståhlberg becomes the first President of Finland
6 December: Finland's independent day becomes 6 December

1920
26 July: Finland takes the Åland Islands dispute to the League of Nations
14 October: Finland and Soviet Russia sign a peace treaty in Tarto
16 December: Finland becomes a member of the League of Nations

References

Political history of Finland
Finland
Finland history-related lists
1910s in Finland